TER Bretagne (stylized as TER BreizhGo since 2018) is the TER regional rail network serving the administrative region of Brittany, in north-west France.

Network
The rail and bus network as of April 2022:

Rail

Road

The bus network BreizhGo consists of 115 routes as of 2022.

Rolling stock

Multiple units 

 9 SNCF Class B 82500
 5 SNCF Class Z 9600
 19 SNCF Class Z 21500
 14 SNCF Class Z 27500
 19 SNCF Class X 2100
 15 SNCF Class X 73500
 8 SNCF Class Z 55500

Locomotives

 9 SNCF Class BB 25500

Ordered
 13 SNCF Class Z 55500

References

External links
Official site

 
Rail transport in Brittany